On sailboats, a sail batten is a flexible insert in a sail, parallel to the direction of wind flow, that helps shape its qualities as an airfoil. Battens are long, thin strips of material, historically wooden but today usually fiberglass, vinyl, or carbon fiber, used to support the roach of a sail. They are also used on tall ships to form the ladders up the shrouds in a fashion similar to ratlines.

History
A junk is an ancient Chinese sailing ship design that is still in use today. Junks were used as seagoing vessels as early as the 2nd century AD and developed rapidly during the Song Dynasty (960–1279). Their rigs featured full-length battens that facilitated short-handed sail handling, including reefing.

Applications in sails
The most common use of sail battens is in the roach of a mainsail. The batten extends the leech past the line that runs from the head and the clew of the sail to create a wider sail towards the top. Cruising sailboats may have four to six battens. Racing sailboats may have full-length battens, as well, that allow for better sail shape. Batten length near the head of the sail is limited by the need for the roach to pass ahead of the backstay, when tacking or jibing. Battens are also found in jibs of beach-cat catamarans.

Batten materials and construction
Most battens are fiberglass pultrusions with a thin, rectangular cross section. An alternative shape is a hollow tube that rotates in the batten pocket and is more compatible with roller furling the mainsail. Because the ends of battens are likely to chafe the sail at the ends of the pockets into which they are inserted, they often have a soft, blunt shape affixed to them.

References

Sailing rigs and rigging